

This is a list of the National Register of Historic Places listings in Benton County, Arkansas.

This is intended to be a complete list of the properties and districts on the National Register of Historic Places in Benton County, Arkansas, United States. The locations of National Register properties and districts, for which the latitude and longitude coordinates are included below, may be seen in a map.

There are 150 properties and districts listed on the National Register in the county. Another 11 properties were once listed but have been removed.

Current listings

|}

Former listings

|}

See also
 List of National Historic Landmarks in Arkansas
 National Register of Historic Places listings in Arkansas

References

External links 

Benton County